Louis A. Lavorato (born September 29, 1934) is a former justice of the Iowa Supreme Court from February 12, 1986, appointed from Polk County, Iowa.

References

Justices of the Iowa Supreme Court
Living people
Place of birth missing (living people)
Drake University alumni
Drake University Law School alumni
1934 births